Kingsley is an English surname and given name. Written in Old English as Cyningesleah, this locational name roughly means "from the king's wood, glade or meadow," and derives from the Old English words Cyning (King) and leah (woodland clearing).

People with the given name "Kingsley" include

A
Kingsley Abasili (born 1984), Nigerian actor
Kingsley Abayie, Ghanaian politician
Kingsley Agbodike (born 1999), Nigerian footballer
Kingsley Akpososo (born 1990), Nigerian footballer
Kingsley Amis (1922–1995), English novelist
Kingsley Amuneke (born 1980), Nigerian footballer
Kingsley Armstrong (born 1962), Saint Lucian football manager
Kingsley Asiam (1921–1982), Ghanaian politician
Kingsley Asoah-Apima (born 1950), Ghanaian politician
Kingsley Ayogu (born 1994), Nigerian artist

B
Kingsley Baird, New Zealand artist
Kingsley Ben-Adir (born 1986), British actor
Kingsley Benedict (1878–1951), American actor
Kingsley Black (born 1968), Northern Ireland footballer
Kingsley Boateng (born 1994), Ghanaian-Italian footballer
Kingsley Bryce (born 1993), American soccer player
Kingsley Bugarin (born 1968), Australian Paralympic swimmer

C
Kingsley Cavell (born 1946), Australian chemist
Kingsley Chinda (born 1966), Nigerian politician
Kingsley Chioma (born 1984), Nigerian footballer
Kingsley Coman (born 1996), French footballer

D
Kingsley C. Dassanaike (1914–??), Sri Lankan academic administrator
Kingsley Davis (1908–1997), American sociologist
Kingsley De Silva (1932–2006), Sri Lankan obstetrician
Kingsley Dixon (born 1954), Australian botanist
Kingsley Dunham (1910–2001), British geologist

E
Kingsley Eduwo (born 1996), Nigerian footballer
Kingsley Ehizibue (born 1995), German footballer
Kingsley Ellis (born 1944), Australian rules footballer
Kingsley Enagbare (born 2000), American football player
Kingsley Esiso, Nigerian lawyer and politician

F
Kingsley Fairbridge (1885–1924), British civil servant
Kingsley Fernandes (born 1998), Indian footballer
Kingsley Fletcher (born 1956), American preacher
Kingsley Fobi (born 1998), Ghanaian footballer

G
Kingsley Aboagye Gyedu (born 1969), Ghanaian politician

H
Kingsley Henderson (1883–1942), Australian architect
Kingsley Holgate (born 1946), South African explorer
Kingsley Hunter (born 1975), Australian rules footballer

I
Kingsley Ikeke (born 1973), Nigerian-American boxer

J
Kingsley James (born 1992), English footballer
Kingsley Jayasekera (1924–2004), Sri Lankan actor
Kingsley Jonathan (born 1998), Nigerian American football player
Kingsley Jones (disambiguation), multiple people

K
Kingsley Keke (born 1996), American football player
Kingsley Kennerley (1913–1982), English billiards player
Kingsley Kuku (born 1970), Nigerian activist

L
Kingsley Lang (born 1988), Zimbabwean rugby union footballer

M
Kingsley Madu (born 1995), Nigerian footballer
Kingsley Martin (1897–1969), British journalist
Kingsley McGowan (born 1992), American rugby union footballer
Kingsley Michael (born 1999), Nigerian footballer
Kingsley Moghalu (born 1963), Nigerian politician
Kingsley Musabula (born 1973), Zambian footballer

N
Kingsley Ng, Hong Kong artist
Kingsley Njoku (born 1986), Nigerian footballer
Kingsley Nyarko, Ghanaian politician

O
Kingsley Obiekwu (born 1974), Nigerian footballer
Kingsley Obuh (born 1976), Nigerian bishop
Kingsley Obumneme (born 1991), Nigerian footballer
Kingsley Ofosu (born 1970), Ghanaian stowaway
Kingsley Ogoro (born 1965), Nigerian film producer
Kingsley Ogwudire (born 1972), Nigerian basketball player
Kingsley Onuegbu (born 1986), Nigerian footballer
Kingsley Chibueze Onyeukwu (born 1991), Nigerian footballer
Kingsley Otuaro (born 1968), Nigerian politician and businessman
Kingsley Owusu (born 2002), Ghanaian footballer

P
Kingsley Pinda (born 1992), French basketball player
Kingsley Kwaku Pinkrah, Ghanaian entrepreneur

R
Kingsley Rajapakse (1934–1983), Sri Lankan film director
Kingsley Rasanayagam (1941–2004), Sri Lankan politician
Kingsley Rock (1937–2019), West Indian cricketer

S
Kingsley Sambo (1936–1977), Zimbabwean painter
Kingsley Sarfo (born 1995), Ghanaian footballer
Kingsley Schindler (born 1993), German footballer
Kingsley Sit (born 1949), Hong Kong politician
Kingsley Smith (born 1969), New Zealand cricketer
Kingsley Sokari (born 1995), Nigerian footballer
Kingsley Swampillai (born 1936), Sri Lankan bishop

T
Kingsley A. Taft (1903–1970), American politician

U
Kingsley Udoh (born 1990), Nigerian footballer
Kingsley Umunegbu (born 1989), Nigerian footballer

V
Kingsley Varghese (born 1998), Indian Software Developer

W
Kingsley Went (born 1981), Zimbabwean cricketer
Kingsley Whiffen (1950–2006), Welsh footballer
Kingsley Wickramaratne, Sri Lankan politician
Kingsley Widmer (1925–2009), American literary critic
Kingsley Wong, Hong Kong politician
Kingsley Wood (1881–1943), British politician

Y
Kingsley Yeboah (born 1996), Ghanaian footballer

See also
Kingsley (surname), a page for people surnamed "Kingsley"
Kinsley (given name)

References